Lijmberta "Bertha" Aaltje Valkenburg (1862-1929) was a Dutch artist.

Biography
Valkenburg was born on 5 January 1862 in Almelo, the daughter of painter . She attended the Rijksakademie van beeldende kunsten (State Academy of Fine Arts) and the Rijksnormaalschool voor Teekenonderwijzers (National Normal School for Drawing Teachers). She studied with August Allebé. In 1910 she married Hendrik Willem Adriaan Krook van Harpen.

Valkenburg died on 1 March 1929 in Laren, North Holland.

Gallery

References

External links

1862 births
1929 deaths
20th-century Dutch women artists